Glanuloplasty is plastic surgery carried out on a glans.  Typical examples include correcting a hypospadias on the penis, or attempting to restore a clitoris mutilated by female genital cutting.

References

Plastic surgery